Powersite is an unincorporated community in Taney County, Missouri, United States. It is located across Lake Taneycomo from Forsyth on the southeast end of Powersite Dam. The community is part of the Branson, Missouri Micropolitan Statistical Area.

A post office called Powersite has been in operation since 1913. The community most likely took its name from nearby Powersite Dam.

References

Unincorporated communities in Taney County, Missouri
Branson, Missouri micropolitan area
Unincorporated communities in Missouri